João and the knife is a 1972 Brazilian drama film directed by Dutch filmmaker George Sluizer. It was entered into the 22nd Berlin International Film Festival. The film was also selected as the Brazilian entry for the Best Foreign Language Film at the 46th Academy Awards, but was not accepted as a nominee.

Cast
 Joffre Soares as João
 Ana Maria Miranda as Maria
 Joao-Augusto Azevedo as Judge
 Douglas Santos as Zeferino
 João Batista as Deodato
 Áurea Campos as Dona Ana (as Aurea Souza Campos)

See also
 List of submissions to the 46th Academy Awards for Best Foreign Language Film
 List of Brazilian submissions for the Academy Award for Best Foreign Language Film

References

External links

João and the Knife (1972) at Sluizer Films (official site).

1972 films
Brazilian drama films
1970s Portuguese-language films
1972 drama films
Films directed by George Sluizer
Dutch drama films